Constantin Iancovescu (1862–1945) was a Romanian politician and general.

During World War I, he was Secretary General of the War Ministry from August to September 1916. He became Chief of the General Staff and Commander of the Danube Defense Group in November 1916 and of the Army 3 Corps from December 1916 to July 24, 1917.

From July 20, 1917 to March 5, 1918, he served as Minister of War. He was promoted in 1918 to lieutenant general.

On December 1, 1917 he was awarded the Order of Michael the Brave, 3rd class, for the way he led his troops at the Battle of the Argeș.

From 1916 to 1919 Iancovescu served as director of the National Military Circle.

References

1862 births
1945 deaths
Chiefs of the General Staff of Romania
Recipients of the Order of Michael the Brave
Romanian Land Forces generals
Romanian Ministers of Defence